Ayumi Hamasaki Countdown Live 2005–2006 A is a DVD issued by a Japanese singer Ayumi Hamasaki. It was released on 23 March 2006. It is well-known for its performance of Boys & Girls in which Hamasaki forgets the lyrics.

Track listing
 Opening
 STEP you
 SURREAL
 UNITE!
 fairyland
 Endless sorrow
 Because of You
 theme of a-nation '03
 evolution
 flower garden
 Humming 7/4
 Boys & Girls
 Bold & Delicious

Encore
 rainy day
 LOVE 〜Destiny〜
 HEAVEN
 Startin'
 Trauma
 winding road

Ayumi Hamasaki video albums
2006 video albums
Live video albums
2006 live albums
Albums recorded at the Yoyogi National Gymnasium